Silverfish is an action game developed and published by Canadian indie studio Chaotic Box and released on November 9, 2010 for iOS.

It received positive reception from critics, who praised its design and graphics.

Gameplay 
The player controls the eponymous "silverfish", which must destroy hordes of other stylized alien bugs. The player is totally weaponless and must touch energy orbs that explode on contact, destroying all the enemies in the vicinity. There are 3 play modes, Reaper, Scavenger and Onslaught. In the first, enemies mimic the player's movements. In the second, enemies follow preset patterns on screen, while in the last, there is a wider array of enemies and the player only gets a small number of lives.

Reception 
The game received positive reception from critics, with an aggregate score of 83/100 on Metacritic.

Levi Buchanan of IGN rated the game 85/100, calling the game a "shooter-dodger-exploder" and saying that it was a "fantastic twitch game for your iPhone".

Keith Andrew of Pocket Gamer gave the game 80/100 and Pocket Gamer's silver award, calling it "intense" and "challenging", and recommending it for people who liked twitch-style games.

Kristan Reed of Eurogamer also rated the game 80/100, saying it was a twist on Geometry Wars 2's Pacifism mode, saying the game was "excellent" but held back by "minor design quirks".

References 

2010 video games
Action video games
Android (operating system) games
IOS games
Video games developed in Canada